Edmond de Bermingham was an Anglo-Irish lord, alive in 1645.

Edmond succeeded upon his father's death in 1645 but had joined, or was about to join, the Franciscan order, so he resigned the lordship to his younger brother, Francis.

He was a contemporary of another Franciscan, Francis Bermingham. Their relationship is unknown.

References
 History of Galway, James Hardiman, Galway, 1820
 The Abbey of Athenry, Martin J. Blake, Journal of the Galway Archaeological and Historical Society, volume II, part ii, 1902
 The Birmingham family of Athenry, H. T. Knox, J.G.A.H.S., volume ten, numbers iii and iv, 1916-17.
 The Birmingham chalice, J. Rabbitte, J.G.A.H.S., volume 17, i and ii, 1936–37

External links
 Medieval Ireland: an encyclopedia
 Edenderry Historical Society
 The Fitzgeralds: Barons of Offaly

People from County Galway
Barons Athenry
Edmond II